Petrus rupestris is a species of fish in the family Sparidae and the only known member of the genus Petrus. The common name of this species is red steenbras. The species numbers have been depleted by overfishing in African waters.

References
 G.D.Johnson, A.C.Gill, J.R.Paxton & W.N. Eschmeyer, ed. 1998.  Encyclopedia of Fishes. San Diego: Academic Press. .
 C.Michael Hogan. 2010. Overfishing. Encyclopedia of Earth. National Council for Science and the Environment. eds. Sidney Draggan and Cutler Cleveland. Washington DC.

External links
Petrus rupestris on Fishbase

Sparidae
Fish described in 1830
Taxa named by Achille Valenciennes